The Inge Morath Award was established by Magnum Photos in tribute to Inge Morath, an Austrian-born photographer who was associated with Magnum for almost fifty years, and who died in January, 2002. Funded by her colleagues at Magnum Photos, the Award is administered by Magnum Foundation in cooperation with the Inge Morath Foundation.

Details
The annual Inge Morath Award is given to a woman photographer under thirty years of age, to assist in the completion of a long term documentary project. The winner and finalists are selected by the photographer members of Magnum Photos, and a representative of the Morath Foundation, at the Magnum annual meeting. It is the only award that carries the imprimatur of Magnum Photos.

The call and guidelines for submissions are announced annually by Magnum Foundation and The Inge Morath Foundation on their web sites, usually in January/February.

Winners and finalists
Clicking on the project name will link to the presentation, hosted at the Inge Morath Foundation's web site.

References

External links
The Inge Morath Foundation

Photography awards
Awards established in 2002